Accotink Bay Wildlife Refuge is a nature preserve on the grounds of Fort Belvoir in Fairfax County, Virginia, United States.  Several other parks, including Mason Neck State Park, Pohick Bay Regional Park, and the Jackson Miles Abbott Wetland Refuge are located nearby.

The refuge was established in 1979 to protect sensitive wetlands and wildlife habitats associated with Accotink Bay and to provide opportunities for environmental education and low-intensity recreation. The refuge offers more than eight miles of hiking trails, including a short paved trail for handicapped access.

Species native to the preserve include:
Foxes
Deer
American toads
Raccoons
Black rat snakes
Eastern box turtles
Various millipedes, including Narceus americanus
Various salamanders, including spotted salamanders and red back salamanders
Various spiders, including Lycosa aspersa
The Accotink Bay Wildlife Refuge Environmental Education Center is located at the entrance to the refuge.  The center features exhibits, videos and trail guides about the refuge and offers nature education programs.

A small parking area with space for six cars (two reserved for handicapped) is located just outside the Tulley Gate entrance off Route 1.

References

External links
 Accotink Bay Wildlife Refuge - VA Dept of Game and Inland Fisheries
 Northern Virginia Hikes - National Park Service information including Accotink Bay Wildlife Refuge

Nature reserves in Virginia
Protected areas of Fairfax County, Virginia
Protected areas established in 1979
1979 establishments in Virginia